The Temple of the Obelisks (maebad al'ansab), also known as the L-shaped Temple and Temple of Resheph was an important Bronze Age temple structure in the World Heritage Site of Byblos. It is considered "perhaps the most spectacular" of the ancient structures of Byblos. It is the best preserved building in the Byblos archaeological site.

Almost all of the artefacts found in the excavation of the temple are displayed at the National Museum of Beirut. It was excavated by French archaeologist Maurice Dunand from 1924-73. The original temple is now in two parts: the base is known as "the L-shaped temple", and the top is known as the "Temple of the Obelisks"; the latter was moved 40 meters east during Maurice Dunand's excavations.

Dunand uncovered 1306 Byblos figurines – ex-voto offerings, including faience figurines, weapons, and dozens of bronze-with-gold-leaf figurines – which have become the "poster child" of the Lebanese Tourism Ministry.

Description

Base: L Shaped Temple

The L-shaped Temple was constructed around 2600 BCE, two centuries after the construction of the Temple of Baalat Gebal (approximately 100m to the west) had been built. It was named the "L-shaped" temple by Dunand, as its two rooms and the courtyard were arranged in such a shape.

The temple had well built walls and temples, in contrast to the later Obelisk temple. It is thought that the L-shaped temple was burned down at the end of the Early Bronze Age.

Top: Obelisk Temple 

The Temple of the Obelisks was constructed around 1600 BCE  on top of the L-shaped temple, retaining its general outline. The temple's name, given by Dunand, refers to a number of obelisks and standing stones located in a court around the cella. The Abishemu obelisk has been interpreted to include a dedication to Resheph, a Canaanite war god, although this is disputed. Another obelisk has a hieroglyphic inscription Middle Bronze Age king of Byblos Ibishemu, praising the Egyptian god Heryshaf.

Since it had been built on top of the L-shaped temple, it was necessary for Dunand to dismantle and move this upper temple in order to excavate the L-shaped temple beneath.

In contrast to the L-shaped temple beneath, the Obelisk Temple was built with irregular walls.

Modern identification and excavation
The temple was first identified by Dunand. The majority of the obelisks found were underground in their original positions, standing upright, while a few others were discovered buried in a favissa (a well for votive deposits).

References

Sources

Archaeological reports

Further reading

External links

Byblos
Temples in Lebanon
Phoenician sites in Lebanon
Phoenician temples